Glass Tower may refer to:

 Glass Tower (video game), iOS tower collapse game
 The Glass Tower, 1957 West German drama film
 Tower of Glass, a 1970 novel by Robert Silverberg
 Glass Towers, Australian indie rock active since 2008
 A tower made with a glass curtain wall
 Glass Tower, the central setting for The Towering Inferno